Ostrów  (Ostriv) is a village in the administrative district of Gmina Radymno, within Jarosław County, Subcarpathian Voivodeship, in south-eastern Poland, close to the border with Ukraine.

The village has a population of 1,800.

References

Villages in Jarosław County